= Simon Gush =

Artist and filmmaker

- Born: Simon; 1981 (age 43–44)
- Citizenship: South Africa
- Occupation: Artist Film maker

Simon Gush (born 1981) is an artist and filmmaker. He lives in Johannesburg, South Africa. His artworks and essay films explore images of labor, work ethic, work rhythms that have shaped Johannesburg.

== Work ==
His practical work is guided primarily by research; he finds his inspiration in various texts, films, classical music and popular culture. Gush first appropriates and then reconfigures objects and experiences from everyday life as he tries to think about the way government and politics work through the quotient.

== Red ==
In 2014 Gush produced the exhibition Red about the 1990 labour unrest at the Mercedes Benz plant in East London, South Africa. The exhibition included a disassembled reconstruction of the red Mercedes built for Nelson Mandela, an installation of speculative reconstructions of strike uniforms by Mokotjo Mohulo, and beds used by strikers. Central to the exhibition was the documentary film Red, made in collaboration with James Cairns.

== Filmography ==
- Sunday Light (2013)
- Red (2014 with James Cairns)
- Iseeyou (2014)
- Calvin and Holiday (2014)
- Lazy Nigel (2015)
- Without Light (2016)
- Invasion (2017)
